Psychosynthesis is an approach to psychology that expands the boundaries of the field by identifying a deeper center of identity, which is the postulate of the Self. It considers each individual unique in terms of purpose in life, and places value on the exploration of human potential. The approach combines spiritual development with psychological healing by including the life journey of an individual or their unique path to self-realization.

The integrative framework of psychosynthesis is based on Sigmund Freud's theory of the unconscious and addresses psychological distress and intra-psychic and interpersonal conflicts.

Development 
Psychosynthesis was developed by Italian psychiatrist, Roberto Assagioli, who was a student of Freud and Bleuler. He compared psychosynthesis to the prevailing thinking of the day, contrasting psychosynthesis for example with existential psychology, but unlike the latter considered loneliness not to be "either ultimate or essential".

Assagioli asserted that "the direct experience of the self, of pure self-awareness...—is true." Spiritual goals of "self-realization" and the "interindividual psychosynthesis"—of "social integration...the harmonious integration of the individual into ever larger groups up to the 'one humanity'"—were central to Assagioli's theory. Psychosynthesis was not intended to be a school of thought or an exclusive method. However, many conferences and publications had it as a central theme, and centres were formed in Italy and the United States in the 1960s.

Psychosynthesis departed from the empirical foundations of psychology because it studied a person as a personality and a soul, but Assagioli continued to insist that it was scientific. He developed therapeutic methods beyond those in psychoanalysis. Although the unconscious is an important part of his theory, Assagioli was careful to maintain a balance with rational, conscious therapeutical work.

Assagioli was not the first to use the term "psychosynthesis". The earliest use was by James Jackson Putnam, who used it as the name of his electroconvulsive therapy. The term was also used by C. G. Jung and A. R. Orage, who were both more aligned to Assagioli's use of the term than Putnam's use. C. G. Jung, in comparing his goals to those of Sigmund Freud, wrote, "If there is a 'psychoanalysis' there must also be a 'psychosynthesis which creates future events according to the same laws'." A. R. Orage, who was the publisher of the influential journal, The New Age, used the term as well, but hyphenated it (psycho-synthesis). Orage formed an early psychology study group (which included Maurice Nicoll who later studied with Carl Jung) and concluded that what humanity needed was not psychoanalysis, but psycho-synthesis.  The term was also used by Bezzoli. Freud, however, was opposed to what he saw as the directive element in Jung's approach to psychosynthesis, and Freud argued for a spontaneous synthesis on the patient's part: "As we analyse...the great unity which we call his ego fits into itself all the instinctual impulses which before had been split off and held apart from it. The psycho-synthesis is thus achieved in analytic treatment without our intervention, automatically and inevitably."

Origins 

In 1909, C.G. Jung wrote to Sigmund Freud of "a very pleasant and perhaps valuable acquaintance, our first Italian, a Dr. Assagioli from the psychiatric clinic in Florence". Later however, this same Roberto Assagioli (1888 – 1974) wrote a doctoral dissertation, "La Psicosintesi," in which he began to move away from Freud's psychoanalysis toward what he called psychosynthesis:

A beginning of my conception of psychosynthesis was contained in my doctoral thesis on Psychoanalysis (1910), in which I pointed out what I considered to be some of the limitations of Freud's views.

In developing psychosynthesis, Assagioli agreed with Freud that healing childhood trauma and developing a healthy ego were necessary aims of psychotherapy, but Assagioli believed that human growth could not be limited to this alone. A student of philosophical and spiritual traditions of both East and West, Assagioli sought to address human growth as it proceeded beyond the norm of the well-functioning ego; he wished to support the fruition of human potential—what Abraham Maslow later termed self-actualization—into the spiritual or transpersonal dimensions of human experience as well.

Assagioli envisioned an approach to the human being that could address both the process of personal growth—of personality integration and self-actualization—as well as transpersonal development—that dimension glimpsed for example in peak experiences (Maslow) of inspired creativity, spiritual insight, and unitive states of consciousness. Psychosynthesis recognizes the process of self-realization, of contact and response with one's deepest callings and directions in life, which can involve either or both personal and transpersonal development.

Psychosynthesis is therefore one of the earliest forerunners of both humanistic psychology and transpersonal psychology, even preceding Jung's break with Freud by several years. Assagioli's conception has an affinity with existential-humanistic psychology and other approaches that attempt to understand the nature of the healthy personality, personal responsibility, and choice, and the actualization of the personal self. Similarly, his conception is related to the field of transpersonal psychology (with its focus on higher states of consciousness), spirituality, and human experience beyond the individual self. Assagioli served on the board of editors for both the Journal of Humanistic Psychology and the Journal of Transpersonal Psychology.

Assagioli presents two major theoretical models in his seminal book, Psychosynthesis, models that have remained fundamental to psychosynthesis theory and practice:

 A diagram and description of the human person
 A stage theory of the process of psychosynthesis (see below).

Aims
In Psychosomatic Medicine and Bio-psychosynthesis, Assagioli states that the principal aims and tasks of psychosynthesis are:

 the elimination of the conflicts and obstacles, conscious and unconscious, that block [the complete and harmonious development of the human personality]
 the use of active techniques to stimulate the psychic functions still weak and immature.

In his major book, Psychosynthesis: A Collection of Basic Writings (1965), Assagioli writes of three aims of psychosynthesis:

Let us examine whether and how it is possible to solve this central problem of human life, to heal this fundamental infirmity of man. Let us see how he may free himself from this enslavement and achieve an harmonious inner integration, true Self-realization, and right relationships with others. (p. 21)

Model of the person 
At the core of psychosynthesis theory is the Egg Diagram, which maps the human psyche into different distinct and interconnected levels.

Lower unconscious
For Assagioli, 'the lower unconscious, which contains one's personal psychological past in the form of repressed complexes, long-forgotten memories and dreams and imaginations', stood at the base of the diagram of the mind.

The lower unconscious is that realm of the person to which is relegated the experiences of shame, fear, pain, despair, and rage associated with primal wounding suffered in life. One way to think of the lower unconscious is that it is a particular bandwidth of one's experiential range that has been broken away from consciousness. It comprises that range of experience related to the threat of personal annihilation, of destruction of self, of nonbeing, and more generally, of the painful side of the human condition. As long as this range of experience remains unconscious, the person will have a limited ability to be empathic with self or others in the more painful aspects of human life.

At the same time, 'the lower unconscious merely represents the most primitive part of ourselves...It is not bad, it is just earlier '. Indeed, 'the "lower" side has many attractions and great vitality', and – as with Freud's id, or Jung's shadow – the conscious goal must be to 'achieve a creative tension' with the lower unconscious.

Middle unconscious
The middle unconscious is a sector of the person whose contents, although unconscious, nevertheless support normal conscious functioning in an ongoing way (thus it is illustrated as most immediate to "I"). It is the capacity to form patterns of skills, behaviors, feelings, attitudes, and abilities that can function without conscious attention, thereby forming the infrastructure of one's conscious life.

The function of the middle unconscious can be seen in all spheres of human development, from learning to walk and talk, to acquiring languages, to mastering a trade or profession, to developing social roles. Anticipating today's neuroscience, Assagioli even referred to "developing new neuromuscular patterns". All such elaborate syntheses of thought, feeling, and behavior are built upon learnings and abilities that must eventually operate unconsciously.

For Assagioli, 'Human healing and growth that involves work with either the middle or the lower unconscious is known as personal psychosynthesis '.

Higher unconscious
Assagioli termed 'the sphere of aesthetic experience, creative inspiration, and higher states of consciousness...the higher unconscious '. The higher unconscious (or superconscious) denotes "our higher potentialities which seek to express themselves, but which we often repel and repress" (Assagioli). As with the lower unconscious, this area is by definition not available to consciousness, so its existence is inferred from moments in which contents from that level affect consciousness. Contact with the higher unconscious can be seen in those moments, termed peak experiences by Maslow, which are often difficult to put into words, experiences in which one senses deeper meaning in life, a profound serenity and peace, a universality within the particulars of existence, or perhaps a unity between oneself and the cosmos. This level of the unconscious represents an area of the personality that contains the "heights" overarching the "depths" of the lower unconscious. As long as this range of experience remains unconscious – in what Desoille termed '"repression of the sublime"' – the person will have a limited ability to be empathic with self or other in the more sublime aspects of human life.

The higher unconscious thus represents 'an autonomous realm, from where we receive our higher intuitions and inspirations – altruistic love and will, humanitarian action, artistic and scientific inspiration, philosophic and spiritual insight, and the drive towards purpose and meaning in life'. It may be compared to Freud's superego, seen as 'the higher, moral, supra-personal side of human nature...a higher nature in man', incorporating 'Religion, morality, and a social sense – the chief elements in the higher side of man...putting science and art to one side'.

Subpersonalities
Subpersonalities based in the personal unconscious form a central strand in psychosynthesis thinking. 'One of the first people to have started really making use of subpersonalities for therapy and personal growth was Roberto Assagioli', psychosynthesis reckoning that 'subpersonalities exist at various levels of organization, complexity, and refinement' throughout the mind. A five-fold process of recognition, acceptance, co-ordination, integration, and synthesis 'leads to the discovery of the Transpersonal Self, and the realization that that is the final truth of the person, not the subpersonalities'.

Some subpersonalities may be seen 'as psychological contents striving to emulate an archetype...degraded expressions of the archetypes of higher qualities '. Others will resist the process of integration; will 'take the line that it is difficult being alive, and it is far easier – and safer – to stay in an undifferentiated state'.

"I"

"I" is the direct "reflection" or "projection" of Self (Assagioli) and the essential being of the person, distinct but not separate from all contents of experience. "I" possesses the two functions of consciousness, or awareness, and will, whose field of operation is represented by the concentric circle around "I" in the oval diagram – Personal Will.

Psychosynthesis suggests that "we can experience the will as having four stages. The first stage could be described as 'having no will, and might perhaps be linked with the hegemony of the lower unconscious. "The next stage of the will is understanding that 'will exists'. We might still feel that we cannot actually do it, but we know...it is possible". "Once we have developed our will, at least to some degree, we pass to the next stage which is called 'having a will, and thereafter "in psychosynthesis we call the fourth and final stage of the evolution of the will in the individual 'being will – which then "relates to the 'I' or self...draws energy from the transpersonal self".

The "I" is placed at the center of the field of awareness and will in order to indicate that "I" is the one who has consciousness and will. It is "I" who is aware of the psyche-soma contents as they pass in and out of awareness; the contents come and go, while "I" may remain present to each experience as it arises. But "I" is dynamic as well as receptive: "I" has the ability to affect awareness, in addition to the contents of awareness, by choosing to focus awareness (as in many types of meditation), expand it, or contract it.

Since "I" is distinct from any and all contents and structures of experience, "I" can be thought of as not a "self" at all but as "noself". That is, "I" is never the object of experience. "I" is who can experience, for example, the ego disintegrating and reforming, who can encounter emptiness and fullness, who can experience utter isolation or cosmic unity, who can engage any and all arising experiences. "I" is not any particular experience but the experiencer, not object but subject, and thus cannot be seen or grasped as an object of consciousness. This "noself" view of "I" can be seen in Assagioli's discussion of "I" as a reflection of Self: "The reflection appears to be self-existent but has, in reality, no autonomous substantiality. It is, in other words, not a new and different light but a projection of its luminous source".  The next section describes this "luminous source", Self.

Self
Pervading all the areas mapped by the oval diagram, distinct but not separate from all of them, is Self (which has also been called Higher Self or Transpersonal Self). The concept of Self points towards a source of wisdom and guidance within the person, a source which can operate quite beyond the control of the conscious personality. Since Self pervades all levels, an ongoing lived relationship with Self—Self-realization—may lead anywhere on the diagram as one's direction unfolds (this is one reason for not illustrating Self at the top of the diagram, a representation that tends to give the impression that Self-realization leads only into the higher unconscious). Relating to Self may lead for example to engagement with addictions and compulsions, to the heights of creative and religious experience, to the mysteries of unitive experience, to issues of meaning and mortality, to grappling with early childhood wounding, to discerning a sense of purpose and meaning in life.

The relationship of "I" and Self is paradoxical. Assagioli was clear that "I" and Self were from one point of view, one.  He wrote, "There are not really two selves, two independent and separate entities. The Self is one". Such a nondual unity is a fundamental aspect of this level of experience. But Assagioli also understood that there could be a meaningful relationship between the person and Self as well:

Accounts of religious experiences often speak of a "call" from God, or a "pull" from some Higher Power; this sometimes starts a "dialogue" between the man [or woman] and this "higher Source"...

Assagioli did not of course limit this relationship and dialogue to those dramatic experiences of "call" seen in the lives of great men and women throughout history. Rather, the potential for a conscious relationship with Self exists for every person at all times and may be assumed to be implicit in every moment of every day and in every phase of life, even when one does not recognize this. Whether within one's private inner world of feelings, thoughts, and dreams, or within one's relationships with other people and the natural world, a meaningful ongoing relationship with Self may be lived.

Stages 

Writing about the model of the person presented above, Assagioli states that it is a "structural, static, almost 'anatomical' representation of our inner constitution, while it leaves out its dynamic aspect, which is the most important and essential one". Thus he follows this model immediately with a stage theory outlining the process of psychosynthesis. This scheme can be called the "stages of psychosynthesis", and is presented here.

It is important to note that although the linear progression of the following stages does make logical sense, these stages may not in fact be experienced in this sequence; they are not a ladder up which one climbs, but aspects of a single process. Further, one never outgrows these stages; any stage can be present at any moment throughout the process of Psychosynthesis, Assaglioli acknowledging 'persisting traits belonging to preceding psychological ages' and the perennial possibility of 'retrogression to primitive stages'.

The stages of Psychosynthesis may be tabulated as follows:
 Thorough knowledge of one's personality.
 Control of its various elements.
 Realization of one's true Self—the discovery or creation of a unifying center.
 Psychosynthesis: the formation or reconstruction of the personality around a new center.

Methods

Psychosynthesis was regarded by Assagioli as more of an orientation and a general approach to the whole human being, and as existing apart from any of its particular concrete applications. This approach allows for a wide variety of techniques and methods to be used within the psychosynthesis context. 'Dialogue, Gestalt techniques, dream work, guided imagery, affirmations, and meditation are all powerful tools for integration', but 'the attitude and presence of the guide are of far greater importance than the particular methods used'. Sand tray, art therapy, journaling, drama therapy, and body work; cognitive-behavioral techniques; object relations, self psychology, and family systems approaches, may all be used in different contexts, from individual and group psychotherapy, to meditation and self-help groups. Psychosynthesis offers an overall view which can help orient oneself within the vast array of different modalities available today, and be applied either for therapy or for self-actualization.

Recently, two psychosynthesis techniques were shown to help student sojourners in their acculturation process. First, the self-identification exercise eased anxiety, an aspect of culture shock. Secondly, the subpersonality model aided students in their ability to integrate a new social identity. In another recent study, the subpersonality model was shown to be an effective intervention for aiding creative expression, helping people connect to different levels of their unconscious creativity. Most recently, psychosynthesis psychotherapy has proven to activate personal and spiritual growth in self-identified atheists.

One broad classification of the techniques used involves the following headings: ' Analytical: To help identify blocks and enable the exploration of the unconscious'. Psychosynthesis stresses 'the importance of using obstacles as steps to growth' – 'blessing the obstacle...blocks are our helpers'. 
' Mastery...the eight psychological functions need to be gradually retrained to produce permanent positive change'. 
' Transformation...the refashioning of the personality around a new centre'. 
' Grounding...into the concrete terms of daily life.
' Relational...to cultivate qualities such as love, openness and empathy'.

Psychosynthesis allows practitioners the recognition and validation of an extensive range of human experience: the vicissitudes of developmental difficulties and early trauma; the struggle with compulsions, addictions, and the trance of daily life; the confrontation with existential identity, choice, and responsibility; levels of creativity, peak performance, and spiritual experience; and the search for meaning and direction in life. None of these important spheres of human existence need be reduced to the other, and each can find its right place in the whole. This means that no matter what type of experience is engaged, and no matter what phase of growth is negotiated, the complexity and uniqueness of the person may be respected—a fundamental principle in any application of psychosynthesis.

Criticism

In the December 1974 issue of Psychology Today, Assagioli was interviewed by Sam Keen and was asked to comment on the limits of psychosynthesis. He answered paradoxically: "The limit of psychosynthesis is that it has no limits. It is too extensive, too comprehensive. Its weakness is that it accepts too much. It sees too many sides at the same time and that is a drawback."

Psychosynthesis "has always been on the fringes of the 'official' therapy world" and it "is only recently that the concepts and methods of psychoanalysis and group analysis have been introduced into the training and practice of psychosynthesis psychotherapy".

As a result, the movement has been at times exposed to the dangers of fossilisation and cultism, so that on occasion, having "started out reflecting the high-minded spiritual philosophy of its founder, [it] became more and more authoritarian, more and more strident in its conviction that psychosynthesis was the One Truth".

A more technical danger is that premature concern with the transpersonal may hamper dealing with personal psychosynthesis: for example, "evoking serenity ... might produce a false sense of well-being and security". Practitioners have noted how "inability to ... integrate the superconscious contact with everyday experience easily leads to inflation", and have spoken of "an 'Icarus complex', the tendency whereby spiritual ambition fails to take personality limitations into account and causes all sorts of psychological difficulties".

Fictional analogies

Stephen Potter's "Lifemanship Psycho-Synthesis Clinic", where you may "find the psycho-synthesist lying relaxed on the couch while the patient will be encouraged to walk up and down" would seem a genuine case of "parallel evolution", since its clear targets, as "the natural antagonists...of the lifeplay, are the psychoanalysts".

Notes

References
 Psychosynthesis: A Collection of Basic Writings by Roberto Assagioli 
 The Act of Will by Roberto Assagioli 
 What We May Be: Techniques for Psychological and Spiritual Growth Through Psychosynthesis by Piero Ferrucci 
 Unfolding Self: The Practice Of Psychosynthesis by Molly Young Brown 
 Psychosynthesis: A Psychology of the Spirit by John Firman and Ann Gila 
 The Primal Wound: A Transpersonal View of Trauma, Addiction, and Growth by John Firman and Ann Gila 
 "Psychosynthesis: The Elements and Beyond" by Will Parfitt 
 A Psychology with a Soul: Psychosynthesis in Evolutionary Context by Jean Hardy 
 Phenomenological, Existential, and Humanistic Psychologies: a Historical Survey by Henryk Misiak and Virginia Staudt Sexton 
 Lombard, C.A. (2014).Coping with anxiety and rebuilding identity: A psychosynthesis approach to culture shock. Counseling Psychology Quarterly, 27:2. http://www.tandfonline.com/eprint/KmPD4Cfz6NhcyXEsdraS/full
 Lombard, C.A. & Müller, B.C.M. (2016) Opening the Door to Creativity: A Psychosynthesis Approach Journal of Humanistic Psychology, June 30, 2016, doi: 10.1177/0022167816653224. http://jhp.sagepub.com/content/early/2016/06/24/0022167816653224.abstract

Bibliography
 Assagioli, R. (1965). Psychosynthesis. New York: The Viking Press.
 _. (1967). Jung and Psychosynthesis. New York: Psychosynthesis Research Foundation.
 _. (1973). The Act of Will. New York: Penguin Books.
 Firman, J., & Gila, A. (1997). The primal wound: A transpersonal view of trauma, addiction, and growth. Albany, NY: State University of New York Press.
 ___. (2002). Psychosynthesis: A psychology of the spirit. Albany, NY: State University of New York Press.
 Jung, C. G. 1954. The Development of Personality, Bollingen Series XX. Princeton, NJ: Princeton University Press.
 Maslow, Abraham. (1962). Toward a Psychology of Being. Princeton, N.J.: D. Van Nostrand Company, Inc.
 McGuire, William, ed. (1974). The Freud/Jung Letters. Vol. XCIV, Bollingen Series. Princeton, N.J.: Princeton University Press.
 Whitmore, D. (2013) Psychosynthesis Counselling in Action (Counselling in Action series) 4th Edition. Sage.
 Sørensen, Kenneth, (2016). The Soul of Psychosynthesis - The Seven Core Concepts. Kentaur Forlag

External links
The Institute of Psychosynthesis The Institute of Psychosynthesis London, founded under the guidance of Roberto Assagioli
The Psychosynthesis Trust founded by Roberto Assagioli
Re-Vision Centre for Integrative Psychosynthesis
Istituto di Psicosintesi The Institute of Psychosynthesis founded by Roberto Assagioli
Association for the Advancement of Psychosynthesis Psychosynthesis resources
Integral Psychosynthesis MA thesis on Integral Psychosynthesis
65 articles on Psychosynthesis Webpage featuring psychosynthesis

Training Schools:
The Institute of Psychosynthesis
Psychosynthesis Trust
Re-Vision
Istituto di Psicosintesi
The Synthesis Center

Humanistic psychology
Human Potential Movement
Spiritual evolution
Systems psychology
Transpersonal psychology